Raúl García Carnero (born 30 April 1989) is a Spanish professional footballer who plays as a left-back for Deportivo de La Coruña on loan from Real Valladolid.

Club career
Born in A Coruña, García began playing football for local Victoria CF, before signing with neighbouring Deportivo de La Coruña at the age of 12. He spent the vast majority of his first years as a senior with the Galicians's B team, also being loaned to Tercera División club Montañeros CF for the 2008–09 season.

On 4 April 2010, García made his first-team – and La Liga – debut, in a 3–0 away defeat against Atlético Madrid. He played a further four league games with the main squad until the end of the campaign and, in June, signed a new one-year contract.

In the following season, García returned to Deportivo B and was loaned to fellow Segunda División B side UD Melilla in the summer of 2011. Subsequently, he was offered a new deal by his parent club, on the condition he accepted another loan; the player refused and signed with UD Almería on 5 July 2012, initially being assigned to the reserves.

García was called up to the first team on 26 October 2012, due to injuries. On the following day, he made his competitive debut with them by starting in a 1–0 Segunda División home win over SD Huesca. He scored his first goal as a professional in the next matchday, a 2–0 victory at Recreativo de Huelva.

On 28 June 2013, after contributing eight appearances as Almería returned to the top flight after two years out, García was promoted to the first team due to a clause on his contract. However, he appeared rarely during the season and was loaned to Deportivo Alavés in January 2014.

García terminated his contract at the Estadio de los Juegos Mediterráneos on 14 July 2014, and joined Alavés permanently just hours later. He scored a career-best five goals in 2015–16, achieving promotion to the main division as champions.

On 5 June 2017, García signed a three-year contract with fellow league club CD Leganés. In January 2019, having been sparingly played during the first part of the season, the free agent joined Girona FC – also of the top tier – on a five-month deal.

On 1 July 2019, after suffering relegation, García moved to Getafe CF on a three-year contract, but agreed to a six-month loan at Real Valladolid the following transfer window. On 28 July 2020, he signed a permanent three-year deal with the latter club.

García returned to his first club Deportivo in July 2022, after agreeing to a one-year loan.

Honours
Alavés
Segunda División: 2015–16

References

External links

1989 births
Living people
Spanish footballers
Footballers from A Coruña
Association football defenders
La Liga players
Segunda División players
Segunda División B players
Tercera División players
Primera Federación players
Deportivo Fabril players
Deportivo de La Coruña players
UD Melilla footballers
UD Almería B players
UD Almería players
Deportivo Alavés players
CD Leganés players
Girona FC players
Getafe CF footballers
Real Valladolid players